Acacia falciformis, also commonly known as broad-leaved hickory, hickory wattle, mountain hickory, large-leaf wattle, tanning wattle and black wattle, is a shrub belonging to the genus Acacia and the subgenus Phyllodineae that is endemic to eastern Australia

Description
It has finely to deeply fissured bark that is grey to black in colour. The glabrous branchlets are angled and commonly terete. It has mostly green phyllode with an oblanceolate or narrowly elliptic shape that are straight to falcate. It can bloom between July and October but most commonly between August and September and produces inflorescences that appear in groups of 5 to 18 in axillary racemes. The flat, leathery, brown seed pods that form after flowering are more or less straight but can be slightly curved.

Taxonomy
The species was first formally described by the botanist Augustin Pyramus de Candolle in 1825 as part of the work Leguminosae. Prodromus Systematis Naturalis Regni Vegetabilis. It was reclassified as Racosperma falciforme in 1987 by Leslie Pedley then transferred back to the genus Acacia in 2006. Other synonyms include; Acacia penninervis var. normalis,  Acacia penninervis var. falciformis, Acacia astringens and Acacia falciformis DC. var. falciformis.
The specific epithet refers to the falcate shape of the phyllodes.
The plant is similar in appearance to Acacia penninervis and Acacia obliquinervia. It can also form hybrids with Acacia bancroftiorum.

Distribution
A. falciformis is widely spread down the east coast of Australia and is present in the states of Queensland, New South Wales and Victoria. It is found in coastal areas extending over the Great Dividing Range to the western slopes. The shrub is situated in a variety of habitat including moist rocky slopes, gullies and along watercourses often as a part of sclerophyll forest or woodland communities. The range of the plant extends discontinuously from Traralgon in the south to the Atherton Tableland in the north. The bulk of the population is found south of Warwick.

See also
 List of Acacia species

References

falciformis
Flora of New South Wales
Flora of Queensland
Flora of Victoria (Australia)
Plants described in 1825
Taxa named by Augustin Pyramus de Candolle